O. D. Cheruvu is a village and mandal in Puttaparthy Assembly Constituency in Andhra Pradesh State.

Villages in Anantapur district